Sandra Rujević (born 29 June 1990 as Sandra Halilović) is a Serbian badminton player. She was the women's doubles national championships from 2010-2013 and in the mixed doubles in 2010. In 2013, she won the international tournament in the women's doubles event partnered with Elme de Villiers of South Africa at the Botswana and South Africa. At the Balkan Championships, she won the bronze medal in the mixed team event.

Achievements

BWF International Challenge/Series
Women's Doubles

 BWF International Challenge tournament
 BWF International Series tournament
 BWF Future Series tournament

References

External links
 

1990 births
Living people
Sportspeople from Novi Sad
Serbian female badminton players